Jon Reginald Dupard (born October 30, 1963) is a former American football running back. He played five seasons in the National Football League. Dupard was selected 26th overall in the 1986 NFL Draft by the New England Patriots. He played for the Patriots until he was traded to the Washington Redskins midway through the 1989 NFL season. Dupard prepped at John Curtis Christian High School in River Ridge, Louisiana, and went on to play at Southern Methodist University. He was drafted one spot behind his college teammate Roderick Jones.   

After retirement from the NFL, Dupard returned to SMU to complete his undergraduate degree and graduated in 1999. Today, he works for high schools in Texas to help marginalized youth graduate high school and inspires them to continue to pursue higher education and/or career certifications.  Dupard is also cofounder with his wife of charity Fit and Faithful Living with a mission to grow youth and families strong by positively impacting lives through after-school programs, summer camps, family health and wellness programs, education awareness and empowerment.   

1963 births
Living people
All-American college football players
American football running backs
New England Patriots players
SMU Mustangs football players
Washington Redskins players
Players of American football from New Orleans